Alavi Institute is an Islamic high school in Tehran, Iran.

History
In 1955, against the backdrop of despair and pessimism of the Great Depression in Iran, Ali Asghar Karbaschian who known as Allameh founded the Alavi Institute as an Islamic high school in Tehran, the capital of Iran. In 1957 new students entered classes on an old house which was bought for about $15000 and remodeled. The school was accredited by the Ministry of Education, and beside academic subjects, taught Islamic matters. Alavi institution is a branch of National Organization of Exceptional Talents and has gained a strong reputation for its bright students.

Mr. Allameh was a scholar in the city of Qom. He said that "There is no important job in more than conduct and help human beings to be better and worship God"''

He left preaching activities and came to Tehran and established the institute in the name of Imam Ali, the first Imam of the Shi'as.

The big milestone after establishing the high school was hiring Ostad Reza Rouzbeh, who was a researcher and teacher, as a Director of the school. Ostad Rouzbeh died in 1973 and after that Dr. Mohammad Reza Khosravi was put in charge.

Admissions 
Alavi High school is difficult to gain admission to.  About 70-80% of the 9th grade class are students that completed education in Alavi's primary and middle schools. The school's admissions process includes an examination and then an interview.  The entrance examination includes Mathematics, Sciences, Persian Literature and History, as well as Shia Islamic fundamentals.  The competition is fierce, and out of the hundreds that take the exam about one hundred are invited back for interviews.  The interviews examine the student's social and religious core, as well as the parents'.  What is looked for is an upper-class or highly educated middle-class family with strong religious convictions.

70-80 students are selected for the 9th grade to form that year's class; these students are then grouped into three classes. The 9th grade class continues to 12th grade and the students are mixed and re-grouped every year; admissions past 9th grade is extremely rare.

Reputation
Several students from Alavi high school have been awarded medals at international math and science olympiads such as IMO, IPHO, ICHO, and IBO.

Education 
Alavi High School teaches its students three majors which are Math and Physics, Natural Sciences, and Humanities.

Alumni 
 Mohammad Javad Zarif
 Mohammad Nahavandian
 Abdol Karim Soroush

Staff 
Hossein Karbaschin, son of Allameh, is the principal of the school as of 2007.

See also

Firouz Bahram High School
Alborz High School
Razi High School

External links
 Allameh Karbaschian

High schools in Iran
Education in Tehran
Educational institutions established in 1957
1957 establishments in Iran
Madrasas in Iran